Stalachtis is a genus of metalmark butterflies (family Riodinidae). It is currently the only member of the tribe Stalachtini, but many metalmark butterflies are yet to be unequivocally assigned to tribes, so this might change eventually.

They are essentially limited to the Amazon biome and the surrounding regions. They are part of complex mimicry rings with Ithomeis, Heliconius and Ithomiinae.

Selected species

 Stalachtis calliope
 Stalachtis euterpe
 Stalachtis halloweeni
 Stalachtis magdalena
 Stalachtis phaedusa
 Stalachtis phlegia

References

External links
TOL
Funet

Riodininae
Riodinidae of South America
Butterfly genera
Taxa named by Jacob Hübner